The Honourable Adam Robert Bruce  (born 18 January 1968) is a Scottish solicitor, businessman, and aristocrat who serves as an officer of Arms at the Court of the Lord Lyon.

Education
Bruce was born in Edinburgh, Scotland. He is the second son of Andrew Bruce, 11th Earl of Elgin, and Victoria Usher. He was educated at Glenalmond College. Bruce went up to Balliol College to read history, and while at the University of Oxford he was elected as the President of the Oxford Union in 1989. He also took a law degree at the University of Edinburgh.

Career
Formerly a solicitor with McGrigors in Edinburgh, where he was Director of Public Policy, Bruce now works in the environmental power industry, having been UK chief executive of Airtricity and the first Chairman of the British Wind Energy Association, now RenewableUK.

He is currently global head of corporate affairs at Mainstream Renewable Power, and from 2009–2015 was a director of the Friends of the Supergrid. In October 2012 he was appointed chairman of the UK Government's Offshore Wind Programme Board. He sat on the steering committee of Norstec, the global offshore wind industry network.

In 2008 Bruce was appointed an officer of arms at the Lyon Court as Unicorn Pursuivant. In April 2012 he was promoted to the position of Marchmont Herald. He was previously Finlaggan Pursuivant (private officer of arms to the Clan Donald), in which role he was installed in 2005 by Godfrey Lord MacDonald. This marked a reinstatement of the traditional MacDonald heraldic role after a break of 510 years.

Bruce is also a Trustee of the St Andrews Fund for Scots Heraldry and a Member of the Council of the Society of Writers to HM Signet.

He sits on a number of advisory bodies, including the Advisory Board of the United Nations High Commissioner for Refugees (UNHCR) Safe Access to Fuel and Energy programme, the Steering Board of RE100, and the Development Board of Oxford University's Maths, Physics and Life Sciences Division. He became a Trustee of National Museums Scotland in April 2017 and his term of appointment ran until March 2021.

in 2016 Bruce narrated a three-part series for UCV TV of Chile on the life of his ancestor Admiral Lord Cochrane.

Family
On 17 May 2003, he married Donna Maria Sofia Giovanna Rosa Granito Pignatelli di Belmonte, a younger daughter of the 13th Prince of Belmonte. They live in Edinburgh and have two children.
He is a descendant of Walter FitzAlan, thus a distant relative of the Stewart dynasty and distant relative of Queen Elizabeth II of the United Kingdom.

Arms

See also
Private Officer of Arms
Pursuivant

References

Scottish solicitors
Scottish officers of arms
1968 births
Living people
Younger sons of earls
Lawyers from Edinburgh
Presidents of the Oxford Union
Adam